The 1943 season was the Chicago Bears' 24th in the National Football League.  The team failed to match on their 11–0 record from 1942 and finished at  8–1–1, under temporary co-coaches Hunk Anderson and Luke Johnsos. On the way to winning the Western Division, the Bears were, yet again, denied a chance at an undefeated season by the defending champion Redskins in Washington. The Bears had their revenge in the NFL title game and defeated the Redskins at Wrigley Field to claim their sixth league title. It was their third championship in four years, establishing themselves as the pro football dynasty of the early 1940s.

Offseason

Attempted merger with the Cardinals
When the United States entered World War II, over 1,000 NFL personnel joined the military, including 350 players and 45 active Bears, the latter featuring over half of the 1942 team. Chicago also lost head coach George Halas to the United States Navy during the 1942 season, which forced assistant coaches Hunk Anderson and Luke Johnsos to take over as co-head coaches. Minority owner Ralph Brizzolara, a friend of Halas', became the interim president and general manager. A shortage of players occurred as teams attempted to salvage their rosters; the Cleveland Rams were eventually forced to shut down for the 1943 season as both of their owners were serving. NFL owners considered going on hiatus for 1943, but elected to reduce roster sizes to 25 from 33, along with allowing free substitution throughout games.

Halas returned to Chicago for the annual owners' meeting on June 19, where the Philadelphia Eagles and Pittsburgh Steelers requested to merge operations for the upcoming season. Halas and Chicago Cardinals owner Charlie Bidwill also did the same; the two owners were close friends, with Bidwill owning a share in the Bears and serving as team secretary before purchasing the Cardinals. A group of four owners, led by George Preston Marshall of the Washington Redskins, opposed the two mergers, which they felt gave the merging teams "an easy out" compared to assembling their rosters on their own like the other teams. The four lobbied for a rule in which one merging team must disperse its players to the other teams in the league, which would have rendered the mergers pointless, though it was passed 5–2 (Philadelphia's Harry Thayer and Pittsburgh's Art Rooney voted against, while Halas and Bidwill abstained). Thayer and Rooney pleaded for the Chicago owners to withdraw their merger proposal, hoping it would increase the chances of the Pennsylvania teams' request succeeding. Halas and Bidwill agreed, while the Eagles/Steelers merger was approved and became the Steagles.

Now on their own, the Bears rebuilt their roster by acquiring players from the shuttered Rams, including running back Dante Magnani and end Jim Benton. After his signing, Magnani commented, "I now get to play with the Bears instead of against them. I don't get beat up anymore."

War Manpower Commission investigation
In September, the Bears wrote a press statement about five players – Magnani, ends Hampton Pool and Al Hoptowit, center Bulldog Turner, and running back Harry Clark – who left their offseason jobs at war plants to join the team for the upcoming season. The release drew the suspicion of the War Manpower Commission (WMC), which launched an investigation into the Bears, who, the commission felt, were a secondary employer to the military. WMC regional director William H. Spencer ordered the players to provide certificates of availability; should they fail to give such documents, they would either have to return to the factories or be automatically placed into the Selective Service System (military draft; 1–A).

Brizzolara defended the team, while NFL Commissioner Elmer Layden cooperated with the WMC and proclaimed "[t]he war comes first". While some teams like the Steagles required all players to maintain wartime jobs in addition to playing, a ruling against the Bears would have affected professional sports as a whole. New York Herald Tribune writer Arthur E. Patterson warned a similar situation in Major League Baseball would have ended the league for the 1944 season if players were "frozen to their war jobs".

On September 23, three days before the season opener, Brizzolara met with Spencer, who also visited Layden a day later. Spencer eventually agreed the five players would be allowed to play for the Bears, who also announced four other players – running backs Bill Geyer and Bill Osmanski, tackle Bill Steinkemper, and defensive end John Siegal – would be enlisting in the Navy.

Return of Bronko Nagurski
After losing to the Redskins in the 1942 NFL Championship Game, Halas sought revenge against Marshall for the game. While stationed on a ship in Milne Bay near New Guinea, Halas considering bringing fullback Bronko Nagurski, who retired after the 1937 season to enter professional wrestling after Halas refused to increase his pay, out of retirement. Three months before the start of the 1943, he submitted a telegram to Anderson: "SIGN NAGURSKI AND PAY FIVE GRAND. STOP.", which was retrieved by Naval decoders who assumed Nagurski was a Japanese spy before forwarding it to Anderson.

Nagurski was contacted by Anderson and was offered the money suggested by Halas. He was initially reluctant due to injuries sustained over his career, but the Great Depression resulted in poor prize money and corruption plaguing the wrestling world, while returning to the Bears would him with an opportunity to support his family. Anderson proposed if Nagurski was unable to consistently run, he could play offensive tackle (a position he played at Minnesota in college); additionally, the new free substitution rules implemented for the 1943 season would allow Nagurski to play until he could stop.

During Training Camp, Nagurski injured many of his teammates with his physical style of play. In one incident, friend and offensive lineman George Musso refused to block Nagurski, prompting Anderson to do so in his place; although he was 45 years old, Anderson hoped to prove he was still tough to his players. Instead, Nagurski collided with Anderson's breastbone and knocked him out, forcing trainer Andy Lotshaw to assist the coach with smelling salts. Upon recovering, Anderson yelled, "Tell that son of a bitch that I can still whip his ass. But not today."

Sid Luckman
Bears quarterback Sid Luckman had one of the greatest seasons for a quarterback in NFL history, and certainly the greatest passing season in the history of the early NFL. "Luckman was essentially the player who first fulfilled the position of quarterback as we know it today: the player expected to handle every snap and attempt almost every pass," says Cold Hard Football Facts. "He was also the first to put up modern-looking numbers. When you consider Luckman's numbers in 1943, consider that the league-wide passer rating that year was a meager 48.5. Hell, his 28 TDs, 12 INTs and 107.5 passer rating would be downright impressive in today's game, let alone back in the virtual Stone Age of the NFL. His 10.9 [yards-per-attempt], meanwhile, is simply mind blowing in any era. The Bears scored 30.3 [points-per-game] in 1943. Again, great in any era."

Schedule

Game summaries

Week 1

Playoffs

Standings

References

Further reading
 
 

Chicago Bears
Chicago Bears seasons
National Football League championship seasons
Chicago Bears